The 1911 Liège–Bastogne–Liège was the sixth edition of the Liège–Bastogne–Liège cycle race and was held on 12 June 1911. The race started and finished in Liège. The race was won by Joseph Van Daele.

General classification

References

1911
1911 in Belgian sport